Do Sar (also Romanized as Dūsar, Dow Sar, and Do Sareh) is a village in Chalanchulan Rural District, Silakhor District, Dorud County, Lorestan Province, Iran. At the 2006 census, its population was 272, in 62 families.

References 

Towns and villages in Dorud County